Momtazuddin Ahmed may refer to:
 Momtazuddin Ahmed (1903–1971), Bangladeshi philosopher and educationist
 Momtazuddin Ahmed (dramatist) (1935–2019), Bangladeshi dramatist
 Momtaz Uddin Ahmed (born 1941), former chief of Bangladesh Air Force

See More 

 A. N. M Momtaz uddin Choudhury, 1st Vice Chancellor of Islamic University, Bangladesh